The 1879 New York state election was held on November 4, 1879, to elect the governor, the lieutenant governor, the secretary state, the state comptroller, the attorney general, the state treasurer and the state engineer, as well as all members of the New York State Assembly and the New York State Senate.

History
Due to the increase of the governor's term to three years by an amendment in 1874, this was the first time the governor and the state cabinet officers were elected at the same time.

The Greenback-Labor state convention met on August 28 and 29 at Utica, New York. William Voorhis was president.

The Republican state convention met on September 3. James W. Wadsworth was nominated for comptroller on the first ballot (vote: Wadsworth 273, John C. Churchill 152). Joseph B. Carr was nominated for secretary of state during the first ballot. Nathan D. Wendell was nominated for treasurer on the first ballot (vote: Wendell 279, Richard A. Elmer 83, Francis B. Brower 54, Francis C. Marvin 19). Hamilton Ward was nominated for attorney general during the first ballot. Howard Soule was nominated for state engineer by acclamation.

The Prohibition state convention met on September 3 at Syracuse, New York. James H. Bronson, of Amsterdam, was chairman. They nominated John W. Mears, of Oneida County, for governor; James H. Bronson for lieutenant governor; Alphonso A. Hopkins for secretary of state; Caleb W. Allis, of Onondaga County, for comptroller; Stephen Merritt for treasurer; Walter Farrington for attorney general; and John J. Hooker for state engineer.

The Democratic state convention met on September 11 at Wieting Hall in Syracuse, New York. Before the first ballot for governor was taken, the Tammany delegates left the convention. Then the incumbent Governor Lucius Robinson was re-nominated on the first ballot (vote: Robinson 243, Henry W. Slocum 56, Clarkson N. Potter 1, Horatio Seymour 1). Clarkson N. Potter was nominated for lieutenant governor by acclamation. Then the incumbents Beach, Olcott, Mackin, Seymour and Schoonmaker were re-nominated by acclamation.

The seceding Tammany delegates re-assembled at Shakespeare Hall. David Dudley Field was president. John Kelly was nominated for governor by acclamation. A Committee of Fifteen was appointed to ponder the question how to proceed and if a whole state ticket should be nominated.

Results
Due to the split of the Democratic vote, Cornell had an easy victory over Robinson. Almost all the other offices were won by the Republicans in a very tight race, only State Engineer Seymour managed to be re-elected on the Democratic ticket. At the time, political commentators voiced their surprise about the strange inconsistency of, on the one side, the total number of votes for Governor compared to the vote for the other state offices on the Republican ticket, and, on the other side, the combined vote of Robinson and Kelly compared to the vote for the other state offices on the joint Democratic/Tammany ticket.

The incumbents Robinson, Beach, Olcott, Schoonmaker and Mackin were defeated. The incumbent Seymour was re-elected.

Obs.:For candidates nominated on more than one ticket, the numbers are the total votes on all tickets. "Scattering votes" (includes votes given for Socialist Labor, Working Men, Jeffersonian Democratic, non-running and non-existing candidates) ranging between 3,900 and 5,312 for the various offices.

Notes

Sources
The tickets:  in NYT on November 3, 1879
Result: GENERAL POLITICAL NEWS.; THE STATE VOTE DECLARED in NYT on December 13, 1879
Result: The Tribune Almanac 1880

See also
New York gubernatorial elections

1879
1879 New York (state) elections